Semester at Sea (SaS) is a study-abroad program which was founded in 1963 and managed by the Institute for Shipboard Education (ISE) in Fort Collins, Colorado. Colorado State University is the current academic sponsor and the program is conducted on a cruise ship. Nearly 73,000 undergraduate students from over 1,500 colleges and universities have participated in Semester at Sea.

During the spring and fall semesters, up to 600 undergraduates participate in the 100- to 110-day program. During the semester the ship circumnavigates the globe, traveling from North America east (across the Atlantic) or west (across the Pacific) and visiting 10 to 11 countries in Asia, Africa, Europe, South America, and North America. Although the program had voyages through the Mediterranean and the Suez Canal, piracy concerns in the Gulf of Aden have changed a typical voyage to around Africa.

History

The program which was founded in 1963 and managed by the Institute for Shipboard Education (ISE). ISE had hosted a summer, 65-day Semester at Sea program which focused on one region of the world. In May 2011, SaS introduced a 26-day Maymester voyage with a curriculum based around the United Nations' Millennium Development Goals. The Maymester voyage offered students the opportunity to earn four to five transferable credits. After the Maymester 2012 voyage, however, Semester at Sea canceled the short-term voyages due to low enrollment. A two-week, December–January Enrichment Voyage for continuing education participants was also cancelled. The voyages' itineraries focused on Central and South America, often transiting the Panama Canal or traveling up the Amazon River.

Before 2000 
A student died in a 1993 hiking accident, and five students were killed in a bus crash during a field trip in India in spring 1996.
The spring 1994 voyage (on the SS Universe) ended in Hong Kong because the ship was scheduled for dry-dock maintenance after the voyage. However, the ship was unable to adhere to its sailing schedule during the semester due to mechanical difficulties. It made several unscheduled stops, and had to anchor between ports while repairs were made. The ship was towed to the South China Sea and anchored overnight, guarded by crew members against piracy. A planned stop at Manila was canceled, and the Universe was rerouted to Singapore. Examinations were completed at anchor in the harbor, and the students and faculty were flown to the next two planned ports (Osaka and Shanghai). In Shanghai, the Universe met the students for the final leg of the voyage to Hong Kong.

1997's fall voyage was rerouted due to terrorism concerns. Ramzi Yousef was convicted of masterminding the 1993 World Trade Center bombing on November 12 of that year, and the U.S. State Department issued a travel warning for American citizens in the Middle East. The Luxor massacre occurred five days later, while the ship was docked in Port Said and the students were in Egypt. Although no students were involved, fears of terrorism resulted in the removal of the next two ports (Israel and Turkey) from the itinerary and the ship was rerouted to Cyprus and Spain.

2000–2009 
Two incidents occurred during the fall 2000 semester on the SS Universe Explorer. Entering Vietnam, the ship was struck by a barge; its hull was damaged, and student rooms were closed. The Universe Explorer remained an extra day in Vietnam for repairs. Preparing to head north through the Suez Canal to Egypt, Turkey, Croatia, and Spain, the ship's captain decided to reroute due to threats to ships in the Suez region; the voyage instead stopped in Kenya, South Africa, and Brazil.

After the September 11 attacks, the Universe Explorer was redirected after its stop in Kobe. The planned route – from Penang and the Indian Ocean through the Suez Canal to ports in Egypt and Croatia – was changed by the U.S. State Department to include Singapore, Seychelles, and Cape Town. On the Indian Ocean, the ship's communication with other vessels was limited to protect the American citizens on board.

On January 26, 2005, the MV Explorer weathered a combination of three storms in the North Pacific. A  freak wave smashed the windows of the bridge, breaking one of them and briefly affecting the ship's navigation systems. The U.S. Coast Guard dispatched a Lockheed HC-130 search-and-rescue plane and two cutters after receiving a distress call from the ship. Two crew members were injured during the incident. While the ship was repaired in Honolulu, the students were flown to Hong Kong to continue their courses. The Explorer rejoined them in Ho Chi Minh City, and completed the semester. Later that year, safety concerns were cited by the University of Pittsburgh for ending its 24-year academic sponsorship of the program.

2005's summer voyage was rerouted from London to Le Havre due to safety concerns after the July 7 London bombings. During the fall 2006 voyage, Typhoon Shanshan caused the MV Explorer (en route from Japan to Qingdao, China) to be rerouted to Hong Kong. The summer 2008 voyage was rerouted from Istanbul to Alexandria due to bomb threats in Turkey. That fall, a University of Wisconsin student was struck and killed by a drunk driver in Hong Kong. The spring and fall 2009 itineraries were altered to avoid Somali pirates in the Gulf of Aden.

2010–2019 
During the fall 2010 voyage, a University of California, Santa Barbara student died while the ship was docked in Ho Chi Minh City. The spring 2011 itinerary was changed after the Tōhoku earthquake and tsunami, and the MV Explorer docked in Taiwan.

During the fall 2012 voyage, a University of Virginia student died in a recreational-boating accident while the ship was docked in Roseau, Dominica. The fall 2014 voyage was rerouted from Senegal and Ghana to Italy and Spain due to Centers for Disease Control and Prevention (CDC) and State Department warnings about the Ebola outbreak in West Africa, and later voyages were also rescheduled. The MS World Odyssey fall 2015 trip was rerouted from Turkey to Croatia to avoid terrorism and the refugee crisis.

The fall 2017 voyage was rerouted from Mauritius at the request of the vessel owner, and the ship went from India to South Africa. On November 7, 2017 in  Bagan, Myanmar, a St. Edward's University student was fatally injured in a  fall from a pagoda.

Spring 2020
The Spring 2020 voyage avoided a number of countries (including China) due to the COVID-19 pandemic. The students, faculty, staff, and Lifelong Learners aboard the MV World Odyssey, were rerouted to Vietnam for an extra week to make up for lost time in China. The World Odyssey left Kobe as scheduled on January 28, arriving in Ho Chi Minh City on February 4. The ship left Ho Chi Minh City three hours late. The original itinerary had the World Odyssey stopping in Malaysia from February 19 to 24 before heading to India from February 29 to March 5. After a one-day fuel stop in Malaysia on February 19, the World Odyssey attempted to reroute to Victoria, Seychelles with an expected arrival on February 27 and departure on March 1. The evening before arrival, however, the Seychellois government denied the vessel entry. The World Odyssey then headed south to Mauritius, and docked on February 29. The ship spent one day in port, followed by two days at sea around the island due to limited dock availability; it then returned to dock in Port Louis on March 3–7. The morning of March 6, students were informed of another itinerary change due to quarantine concerns when arriving at European ports from North Africa. SAS concluded the Spring 2020 voyage, cancelling all South Africa related programming on March 12 and advised students to return home from Cape Town in light of a U.S. State Department worldwide travel advisory. All students were required to disembark from the World Odyssey between March 14, 2020 and March 16, 2020, were provided with resources to help them travel home, and completed the academic program remotely from March 17 and April 20.

Fall 2020 
On Tuesday, May 12, 2020, Semester at Sea announced that the Fall 2020 voyage would not be sailing as planned citing the COVID-19 pandemic and health and safety being the primary decision factor. The modified itinerary was scheduled to being with an online program and then continuing on with a condensed voyage beginning in late October. Voyagers were scheduled to embark in Tenerife, Canary Islands, sail on to Trinidad and Tobago, Belize, Colombia, Panama Canal Transit, Ecuador, and Easter Island (Chile) with final voyage disembarkation taking place in Puntarenas, Costa Rica.

Academics 
Students attend classes in a number of subjects and disciplines, including humanities courses relevant to one (or more) of the countries on the itinerary, while the ship is at sea. All students are required to take an interdisciplinary, core global-studies course. Although Colorado State University is the program's academic sponsor, Semester at Sea is open to students from any university. Faculty members are drawn from colleges and universities throughout the United States and around the world.

No classes are taught in port, and students can take Semester at Sea-sponsored trips or travel independently in the port country. Before arriving at a port, they are briefed on the culture and societal rules of the country they are visiting. At the port of call, guest speakers (including community leaders and American ambassadors) deliver lectures to the students and faculty. The pre-port briefing and guest lectures are intended to prepare students for their stay in the country.

Lecturers and guests 
Notable lecturers and guests have included:
Corazon Aquino
Fidel Castro
Tung Chee-hwa
Arthur C. Clarke
Fahd of Saudi Arabia
Indira Gandhi
Mikhail Gorbachev
Nelson Mandela
Mohammed VI of Morocco
Paul Muldoon
Pete Peterson
Prince Moulay Rachid of Morocco
Anwar Sadat
Desmond Tutu
Mother Teresa

Ships 

The SS Seawise University (formerly the RMS Queen Elizabeth), which SaS intended to use, burned and sank in 1972 in Hong Kong Harbour during her conversion into a floating campus. The Universe Explorer, which retired in 2005, had four main decks and a small swimming pool at the stern of the ship. The Seawise University, Universe, and Universe Explorer were supplied and managed by Tung Chao Yung's Seawise Foundation. Concerns about the separation of the Institute for Shipboard Education and the Seawise Foundation and the safety of the MV Explorer contributed to the University of Pittsburgh's severing ties to the program in 2005.

Ports of call 
The program itinerary differs each semester, and the ship typically docks at 10 or 11 ports. An early-1990s  spring itinerary included Nassau, Caracas, Salvador (Brazil), Cape Town, Mombasa, Chennai, Singapore, Shanghai, Osaka and Hong Kong. More recent voyages have explored Hawaii, Japan, China, Vietnam, Myanmar, India, Mauritius, South Africa, Ghana, Morocco and the Netherlands. The fall 2019 itinerary included the Netherlands, Poland, the Kiel Canal, Portugal, Spain, Croatia, Morocco, Ghana, Brazil, Trinidad and Tobago, the Panama Canal, Ecuador and Costa Rica. Denmark was a port of call in summer 2008, Namibia in fall 2008, Bulgaria in summer 2009 and Senegal in fall 2015 (the program's first visits to those countries).
 Semester at Sea had one summer voyage in 1996. The ship left from Ensenada, Mexico and spent two months in the South Pacific stopping in Papeete, Tahiti; Auckland, New Zealand; Sydney, Australia; Suva, Fiji; Apia, Western Samoa; and Hilo, Hawaii before ending the voyage in Seattle, Washington.

See also 
 The Scholar Ship

References

External links 
 

Study abroad programs
University of Virginia
University of Pittsburgh
University of Colorado
Chapman University
Educational institutions established in 1963
Semester at sea programs